The LNER Class J64 was a class of three  steam locomotives of the London and North Eastern Railway.

They were built by Hudswell Clarke for the Mid-Suffolk Light Railway and were acquired by the LNER when it took over the Mid-Suffolk in 1924.  Number 3 was withdrawn immediately and never received an LNER number. Nos. 1 and 2 were renumbered as LNER 8316 and 8317 respectively.

Dimensions
The dimensions for Nos. 1 and 2 are shown in the infobox (right).

Withdrawal
Withdrawal dates were:
 No.1 (LNER 8316) January 1928
 No.2 (LNER 8317) December 1929
 No.3 (no LNER number) August 1924

None of the locomotives is preserved.

References

0-6-0T locomotives
J64
Railway locomotives introduced in 1904
Scrapped locomotives
Standard gauge steam locomotives of Great Britain
Hudswell Clarke locomotives